Constitution of China may refer to:

Constitution of the People's Republic of China (1982)
1954 Constitution of the People's Republic of China
1975 Constitution of the People's Republic of China
1978 Constitution of the People's Republic of China
Constitution of the Republic of China (1947)
Provisional Constitution of the Republic of China (1912)
1923 Constitution of the Republic of China
Provisional Constitution of the Political Tutelage Period (1931)
Temporary Provisions against the Communist Rebellion (1948, suspension of most articles of the 1947 constitution)
Additional Articles of the Constitution of the Republic of China (1991, amended version of the 1947 constitution)
Constitution of Qing
Principles of the Constitution (1908)
Nineteen Creeds (1911)

See also
Constitution of the Chinese Communist Party
Constitution of the Nationalist Party of China